Mala Dobrava is a small settlement in the Municipality of Ivančna Gorica in central Slovenia. It lies in the hills northwest of Ivančna Gorica in the historical region of Lower Carniola. The municipality is now included in the Central Slovenia Statistical Region.

References

External links

Mala Dobrava on Geopedia

Populated places in the Municipality of Ivančna Gorica